Gabriel Oghre (born 25 May 1998) is an English professional rugby union player, for Union Bordeaux Bègles in France's Top 14, he previously played for Wasps and Leicester Tigers in Premiership Rugby.

Club career
Oghre joined the academy of Bath from Millfield. He did not make an appearance for the Bath senior side and in July 2017 signed for Wasps. In November 2017 he made his club debut against Newcastle Falcons in the Anglo-Welsh Cup and the following year made his league debut against Saracens. Oghre came off the bench during the final of the 2019–20 Premiership Rugby season as Wasps finished runners up to Exeter Chiefs.

Wasps entered administration on 17 October 2022 and Ohgre was made redundant along with all other players and coaching staff. On 21 November 2022, Oghre joined Leicester Tigers on a short term deal. He made his Leicester debut as a replacement on 11 December 2022 in a 23-17 win against the Ospreys, and featured twice more for Leicester before joining Union Bordeaux Bègles for the rest of the 2022-23 Top 14 season.

International career
In April 2017 Oghre made an appearance for England at under-19 level. He represented the England under-20 team that finished runners up to France in the 2018 Six Nations Under 20s Championship and 2018 World Rugby Under 20 Championship.

In September 2021 Oghre was called up to the senior England squad for a training camp.

References

External links
Wasps Profile
ESPN Profile
Ultimate Rugby Profile

1998 births
Living people
English rugby union players
Black British sportspeople
English people of Nigerian descent
People educated at Beechen Cliff School
People educated at Millfield
Rugby union hookers
Rugby union players from Westminster
Wasps RFC players
Leicester Tigers players